Cézar Augusto do Nascimento or simply Cézar  (born April 4, 1985 in Cornélio Procópio-PR), is a Brazilian striker. He currently plays for Palmeiras on loan from Grêmio.

Honours
Campeonato Baiano: 2004
Campeonato Brasileiro Série B: 2005

Contract
Palmeiras (Loan) 15 January 2007 to 31 December 2007
Grêmio 15 August 2005 to 14 August 2009

References

External links
 CBF
 Jogador da equipe B do Palmeiras sofre acidente e fica internado
 Jogador do Verdão B sofre acidente de carro

1985 births
Living people
Brazilian footballers
Esporte Clube Vitória players
Grêmio Foot-Ball Porto Alegrense players
Grêmio Esportivo Brasil players
Sociedade Esportiva Palmeiras players
Association football forwards